ALCS most commonly refers to the American League Championship Series in American baseball.

ALCS may also refer to:
 Abundant Life Christian School, a K4-12 school in Madison, Wisconsin
 ALCS transaction monitor, an IBM mainframe transaction processing monitor for the airline industry
 Authors' Licensing and Collecting Society
 Airborne Launch Control System, the method of launching ICBMs during a nuclear attack